Gošince is a village in the municipality of Lipkovo, North Macedonia.

History
Descendants of the Krasniqi fis were recorded in the villages of Gošince, Slupčane, Alaševce and Runica in 1965.

Demographics
As of the 2021 census, Gošince had 167 residents with the following ethnic composition:
Albanians 92
Persons for whom data are taken from administrative sources 75

According to the 2002 census, the village had a total of 424 inhabitants. Ethnic groups in the village include:

Albanians 420
Bosniaks 1
Others 3

References

External links

Villages in Lipkovo Municipality
Albanian communities in North Macedonia